Conospermum filifolium is a shrub endemic to Western Australia.

It blooms between July and December producing white-blue flowers.

It is found on sand plain areas in the southern Wheatbelt,  Great Southern and Goldfields-Esperance regions of Western Australia where it grows in sandy to clay soils often over laterite.

There are two subspecies:
 Conospermum filifolium subsp. australe
 Conospermum filifolium subsp. filifolium

References

External links

Eudicots of Western Australia
filifolium
Endemic flora of Western Australia
Plants described in 1845